James Hubert McKean (2 August 1884 – 30 October 1936) was an Australian rules footballer who played with Collingwood in the Victorian Football League (VFL).

Notes

External links 

Jim McKean's profile at Collingwood Forever

1884 births
1936 deaths
Australian rules footballers from Melbourne
Collingwood Football Club players